The Social Democrats is a social democratic political party in Denmark. A member of the Party of European Socialists (PES), the Social Democrats have 50 out of 179 members of the Danish parliament (following the latest Danish general election held in 2022), Folketing, and three out of fourteen MEPs elected from Denmark. 

Founded by Louis Pio in 1871, the party first entered the Folketing in the 1884 Danish Folketing election. By the early 20th century, it had become the party with the largest representation in the Folketing, a distinction it would hold for 77 years. It first formed a government after the 1924 Danish Folketing election under Thorvald Stauning, the longest-serving Danish Prime Minister of the 20th century. During Stauning's government which lasted until the 1926 Danish Folketing election, the Social Democrats exerted a profound influence on Danish society, laying the foundation of the Danish welfare state. From 2002 to 2016, the party used the name Socialdemokraterne in some contexts. The party was a member of the Labour and Socialist International from 1923 to 1940. A member of the Socialist International until 2017, the party withdrew to join the Progressive Alliance, founded in 2013.

The party was the major coalition partner in government from the 2011 Danish general election, with then-party leader Helle Thorning-Schmidt as Prime Minister. After the 2015 Danish general election, the party was no longer in government, although it regained the position as the largest party in the Folketing, with 47 of 179 seats. Thorning-Schmidt withdrew as party leader on the night of the election as a direct consequence of the loss of government control and she was succeeded on 28 June 2015 by the former Vice Leader Mette Frederiksen, who shifted the party back to the political left on economics, while criticising mass immigration.

Overview 
The party traces its own history back to the International Labour Association, founded in 1871 and banned in 1873, loosely re-organised in the Social Democratic Labour Party which in 1876 issued the Gimle program, but as a formal political party it was first founded from 11–12 February 1878 as the Social Democratic Federation. This name was formally carried by the party for almost a hundred years, although in practice it also used a number of other names until it changed its name to Social Democracy in 1965. At a congress in Aalborg in 2002, the party changed its name to the Social Democrats, but from 2016 again only Social Democracy is used.

The party has the letter A as a symbol, but the abbreviation S is often used in the media. The party's classic symbol is a red rose and in recent times an A in a red circle. Aside from the classical socialist red colour, the party has recently adopted a more light red colour called competition orange.

The party was a member of the Labour and Socialist International between 1923 and 1940. It is now a member of the Progressive Alliance, an association of progressive social-democratic parties. The Social Democrats are also a member of the Party of European Socialists while the party's MEPs sit in the Socialists & Democrats group.

History

19th century 

The party was founded as the International Labour Association of Denmark on 15 October 1871 by Louis Pio, Harald Brix and Paul Geleff. The goal was to organise the emerging working class on a democratic and socialist basis. The industrialisation of Denmark had begun in the mid-19th century and a period of rapid urbanisation had led to an emerging class of urban workers. The social-democratic movement emerged from the desire to give this group political rights and representation in the Folketing, the Danish parliament. In 1876, the party held an annual conference, adopting the first party manifesto.

The stated policy was as follows: 

In 1884, the party had their first two members of parliament elected, namely Peter Thygesen Holm and Chresten Hørdum.

20th century 

In 1906, the party created the Social Democratic Youth Association, lasting until 1920 when the Social Democratic Youth of Denmark and current party's youth wing was founded.

In the 1924 Danish Folketing election, the party won the majority with 36.6 percent of the vote and its first government was put in place with Thorvald Stauning as Prime Minister. That same year, he appointed Nina Bang as the world's first female minister, nine years after women's suffrage had been given in Denmark. Stauning stayed in power until his death in 1942, with his party laying the foundations for the Danish welfare state based on a close collaboration between labor unions and the government.

In January 1933, Stauning's government entered into what was then the most extensive settlement yet in Danish politics, namely the Kanslergade settlement with the liberal party Venstre. The settlement was named after Stauning's apartment in Kanslergade in Copenhagen and included extensive agricultural subsidies and reforms of the legislation and administration in the social sector. In 1935, Stauning was reelected with the famous slogan "Stauning or Chaos".

Stauning's second cabinet lasted until the Nazi occupation of Denmark in 1940, when the cabinet was widened to include all political parties for a national unity government and the Danish government pursued a collaborative policy with the German occupiers. Through the 1940s and until 1972, Denmark's Prime Ministers were all from the party.

Poul Nyrup Rasmussen government coalition: 1993–2001 

The Social Democrats' social policy through the 1990s and continuing in the 21st century involved a significant redistribution of income and the maintenance of a large state apparatus with collectively financed core public services such as public healthcare, education and infrastructure.

Social Democrats-led coalition governments (the I, II, III and IV Cabinets of Poul Nyrup Rasmussen) implemented the system known as flexicurity (flexibility and social security), mixing strong Scandinavian unemployment benefits with deregulated employment laws, making it easier for employers to fire and rehire people in order to encourage economic growth and reduce unemployment.

The Cabinets of Poul Nyrup Rasmussen maintained a parliamentary majority during the period from 1993 to 2001 by virtue of their support from the Socialist People's Party and the Red–Green Alliance.

Towards the end of the 1990s, a trade surplus of 30 billion kroner (US$4.9 billion) turned into a deficit. To combat this, the government increased taxes, limiting private consumption. The 1998 initiative, dubbed the Whitsun Packet (Danish: Pinsepakken) from the season it was issued, was not universally popular with the electorate which may have been a factor in the Social Democrats' defeat in the 2001 Danish general election.

In opposition: 2001–2011 
After being defeated by the Liberal Party in the 2001 Danish general election, the party chairmanship went to former finance and foreign minister Mogens Lykketoft. Following another defeat in the 2005 Danish general election, Lykketoft announced his resignation as party leader and at an extraordinary congress on 12 March it was decided that all members of the party would cast votes in an election of a new party leader. The two contenders for the leadership represented the two wings in the party, with Helle Thorning-Schmidt being viewed as centrist and Frank Jensen being viewed as slightly more left-leaning. On 12 April 2005, Thorning-Schmidt was elected as the new leader.

Helle Thorning-Schmidt government coalition: 2011–2015 
In the 2011 Danish general election, the Social Democrats gained 44 seats in parliament, the lowest number since 1953. Nonetheless, the party succeeded in establishing a minority government with the Danish Social Liberal Party and the Socialist People's Party. The incumbent centre-right coalition led by the Liberal Party lost power to a centre-left coalition led by the Social Democrats, making Thorning-Schmidt the country's first female Prime Minister. The Danish Social Liberal Party and the Socialist People's Party became part of the three-party centre-left coalition government. The new parliament convened on 4 October. The government rolled back anti-immigration legislation enacted by the previous government and passed a tax-reform with support from the liberal-conservative opposition. The tax reform raised the top tax threshold, which had previously applied to over half the working population. The aim of the tax reform was to increase labour output to fend off a projected labour shortage within the next decades. The stated goal was to entice Danes to work more in order to compensate for the decreasing workforce by lowering tax on wages and gradually lowering welfare payments to those outside of the labour market to increase the economic benefit of working relative to receiving welfare.

On 3 February 2014, the Socialist People's Party left the government in protest over the sale of shares in the public energy company DONG Energy to the investment bank Goldman Sachs. Because of the government's minority status and of its dependency on the support of the Danish Social Liberal Party, the government had to jettison many of the policies that the Social Democrats–Socialist People's Party coalition had given during the campaign. Although critics have accused the government of breaking its promises, other studies argue that it accomplished half of its stated goals, blaming instead poor public relations strategies for its increasingly negative public image. The government pursued a centrist compromise agenda, building several reforms with support from both sides of the parliament. This caused friction with the supporting Red–Green Alliance, who were kept outside of influencing decisions.

In opposition: 2015–2019 
In the 2015 Danish general election, the Social Democrats gained seats and became the biggest party in the parliament again since 2001, yet lost the government because the right-wing parties had a majority. The results of the 2015 election and the defeat of the left-bloc led Thorning-Schmidt to resign as Prime Minister on election night and making way for the next leader Mette Frederiksen. Under Frederiksen, the Social Democrats voted in favor of a law allowing Danish authorities to confiscate money, jewellery and other valuable items refugees crossing the border may have, despite harsh condemnation from the United Nations Human Right Council and widespread comparisons between the plan and the treatment of Jews in Nazi-occupied Europe.

Similarly, the Social Democrats voted for a law banning wearing of burqas and niqabs, while abstaining during a vote on a law on mandatory handshakes irrespective of religious sentiment at citizenship ceremonies and on a plan to house criminal asylum seekers on an island used for researching contagious animal diseases. Frederiksen has also backed the right-wing populist Danish People's Party in their paradigm shift push to make repatriation rather than social integration the goal of asylum policy. She has called for a cap on non-Western immigrants, expulsion of asylum seekers to a reception centre in North Africa and forced labour for immigrants in exchange for benefits. Labeling foreign policies of Europe as too economic liberal, Frederiksen has criticised other social democratic parties for losing their voters' trust by failing to prevent globalisation chipping away at labour rights, increasing inequality and exposing them to uncontrolled immigration.

2019–present: Frederiksen I and II 

In the 2019 Danish general election, the Social Democrats gained one further seat and the opposition red bloc of left-wing and centre-left parties (the Social Democrats, the Danish Social Liberal Party, the Socialist People's Party and the Red–Green Alliance along with the Faroese Social Democratic Party and Greenland's Inuit Ataqatigiit and Siumut) won a majority of 93 out of 179 seats in the Folketing while support for the Danish People's Party and the Liberal Alliance collapsed, costing Lars Løkke Rasmussen his majority. With the result beyond doubt on election night, Rasmussen conceded defeat and Frederiksen has been commissioned by Queen Margrethe II to lead the negotiations to form a new government. On 27 June 2019, Frederiksen was successful in forming the Frederiksen Cabinet, an exclusively Social Democrats minority government supported by the red bloc, becoming the second woman in the role after Thorning-Schmidt as well as the youngest Prime Minister in Danish history at the age of 41.

Despite having run on an anti-immigration stance during the election, Frederiksen shifted her stance on immigration by allowing more foreign labour and reversing government plans to hold foreign criminals offshore after winning government.

Platform 
Since its foundation, the lemma of the party has been "Liberty, Equality and Brotherhood" and these values are still described as central in the party program. In the political program, these values are described as being consistent with a focus on solidarity with the poorest and social welfare to those who need it, with individual responsibility in relation to other members in society and with an increased involvement in the European Union project.

As well as adopting more left-leaning economics, the party has become increasingly sceptical of mass immigration from a left-wing perspective in the late 2010s, as it believes it has had negative impacts for much of the population, a more pressing issue since at least 2001 after the 11 September attacks which intensified during the 2015 European migrant crisis. It also returned to a more sceptical view of economic liberalism, including the view that perception of adopting the Third Way and practicing centrist, neoliberal economics, and supporting unrestricted economic globalisation contributed to its poor electoral performance in the late 2000s and early 2010s. In a biography written before becoming the prime minister in 2019, Mette Frederiksen wrote: "For me, it is becoming increasingly clear that the price of unregulated globalisation, mass immigration and the free movement of labour is paid for by the lower classes."

Political leadership 
The current Party Leader is Mette Frederiksen. She succeeded Helle Thorning-Schmidt, who stepped down after the left bloc's defeat in the 2015 Danish general election. Deputy Party Leaders are Lennart Damsbo-Andersen and Christian Rabjerg Madsen. The Secretary General is Annette Lind.

Prime ministers 

 Thorvald Stauning (1924–1926, 1929–1942)
 Vilhelm Buhl (1942, 1945)
 Hans Hedtoft (1947–1950, 1953–1955)
 Hans Christian Hansen (1955–1960)
 Viggo Kampmann (1960–1962)
 Jens Otto Krag (1962–1968, 1971–1972)
 Anker Jørgensen (1972–1973, 1975–1982)
 Poul Nyrup Rasmussen (1993–2001)
 Helle Thorning-Schmidt (2011–2015)
 Mette Frederiksen (2019–incumbent)

Leaders of the Social Democrats

Election results 
The Social Democrats governed Denmark for most of the 20th century, with a few intermissions such as the Conservative People's Party-led government of Poul Schlüter in the 1980s. It continued to be Denmark's largest party until 2001 when Anders Fogh Rasmussen's liberal Venstre party gained a landslide victory, becoming the largest party and forming a centre-right government. The Social Democrats returned to government from 2011 to 2015 and since 2019.

Parliament

Local elections

European Parliament elections

Representation

Folketing 

At the 2019 election the Social Democrats won 48 seats in parliament. Henrik Sass Larsen was originally elected, but resigned his seat on 30 September 2019, after which Tanja Larsson took over his seat. Ida Auken was originally elected as a member of the Socialist People's Party, but switched to the Social Democrats on 29 January 2021.

European Parliament 

At the 2019 European Parliament election the Social Democrats won 3 seats. The Social Democrats are part of the Progressive Alliance of Socialists and Democrats in the European Parliament.
 Niels Fuglsang
 Christel Schaldemose
 Marianne Vind

Nordic Council 
4 of the 16 Danish members of the Nordic Council are members of the Social Democrats. The members of the Nordic Council are not elected by the public, but instead chosen by the parliamentary party groups. The Social Democrats are part of The Social Democratic Group in the Nordic Council.
 Orla Hav
 Anders Kronborg
 Henrik Møller
 Kasper Roug

Youth wings 

The Social Democratic Youth of Denmark (Danish: Danmarks Socialdemokratiske Ungdom) is the Social Democrats' youth wing. It was founded on 8 February 1920 and is an independent organization from the Social Democrats. This allows them to formulate their own policies and make their own campaigns. Prominent Social Democrats beginning their political work in the Social Democratic Youth include prime ministers Hans Hedtoft, H. C. Hansen, Jens Otto Krag, Anker Jørgensen and Mette Frederiksen, as well as ministers Per Hækkerup and Morten Bødskov.

Frit Forum is the Social Democrats' student organization. It was founded in 1943 in Copenhagen. It has since 1973 been organizationally part of Social Democratic Youth. Prominent members previously leading Frit Forum include prime minister Poul Nyrup Rasmussen and other leaders of the Social Democrats Mogens Lykketoft and Svend Auken.

See also 

 Politics of Denmark

References

External links 
  
 Official website 

 
1871 establishments in Denmark
Members of the Labour and Socialist International
Centre-left parties in Europe
Party of European Socialists member parties
Political parties established in 1871
Progressive Alliance
Second International
Social democratic parties in Europe
Socialist parties in Denmark